Congregation Beth El is a synagogue located in Bethesda, Maryland. Beth El is an egalitarian synagogue providing diverse worship in the Conservative tradition.

Congregation Beth El started in 1951 as a synagogue of 16 families and has grown to approximately 1,000 families.

Greg Harris is Rabbi, Deborah Megdal is Associate Rabbi, and Bill Rudolph is Rabbi Emeritus. Asa Fradkin is Hazzan and Abe Lubin is Hazzan Emeritus. Rudolph, Harris, and Lubin have each been featured on the PBS television program Religion & Ethics Newsweekly.

On the bimah of the main sanctuary are two large tapestries, installed in September 1997. Created by local artist Tamar Fishman and executed by British weaver Pat Johns, the tapestries are inspired by two narratives from the Book of Genesis that envision episodes in the life of the patriarch Jacob. One tapestry, named Beth El, reflects  and the other, named Israel, reflects  The tapestry Beth El was dedicated by former congregation President Walter Arnheim.

Congregation Beth El has received recognition for its award-winning adult education program, the Saul Bendit Institute. Beth El's adult b'nai mitzvah ceremony received special notice in 2010 when 94-year-old Esther Isralow became the oldest of 19 congregants to complete the 18 months of study led by Rabbi Harris that culminated in the service. And Congregation Beth El has held interfaith seminars, such as a 2010 seminar on leadership with perspectives from the Hebrew Bible, the New Testament, and the Koran.

In 2008, Congregation Beth El received a grant from the Pathways Awareness Foundation recognizing its actions to include worshippers of all abilities. In 2009, the United Synagogue of Conservative Judaism gave Beth El an award for the quality of its bulletins.

References

External links
 

Buildings and structures in Bethesda, Maryland
Synagogues in Montgomery County, Maryland
Conservative synagogues in Maryland
Jewish organizations established in 1951
1951 establishments in Maryland